Waris Jari Hantu (Ghost Finger's Heir) is a 2007 Malaysian horror film directed by Shuhaimi Baba. The film won Rusdi Ramli, one of its lead actors, The Best Actor award at the 20th Malaysia Film Festival.

Plot
Tok Wan Rimau (Azean Irdawaty) is the elderly custodian of a hereditary tiger spirit who uses her knowledge of herbalism and massage for healing. She seeks a female heir to her powers which are traditionally passed from mother to daughter. Tina (Maya Karin) and Ari (Rusdi Ramli) are the relatives of Tok Wan. They are also best friends. Tok Wan's spiritual tiger protects her family and their village from harm. Tina, who is in love with Ari, nurtures her secret dream of marrying him even though the villagers often ridicule the effeminate Ari as a sissy. Deeply traumatised by these insults, Ari continues to hide behind his close relationship with Tina. Despite parental objections, Tina seems destined to be the next in line as custodian of the mystical tiger. But Ari steps in, offering himself instead.

Cast
 Maya Karin as Tina
 Rusdi Ramli as Ari
 Azean Irdawaty as Tok Wani Rimau
 Liza Othman as Hayati mother's
 Zahim Albakri as Johan
 Nanu Baharudin as Kasma
 Riezman Khuzaimi as Roslan
 Kavita Sidhu as Ira
 Zaidi Omar as Pak Ngah Jalal
 Rashid Salleh as Ah Chong
 Joanna Bessey
 Ida Nerina as Bank Seller
 Jit Murad
 Dang Suria

Production 
Filming had been done in several locations namely Kuala Lumpur and the states of Pahang and Negeri Sembilan; the latter state being the origin of the myth of the were-tiger in which the film revolves around.

To prepare for the role as Tok Wan, Azean had practiced imitating the moves of a tiger for many hours a day on set, even to a point of watching several documentaries from Animal Planet and National Geographic as reference.

References

External links
 

2007 films
2007 horror films
Films set in Malaysia
Malay-language films
Malaysian LGBT-related films
Malaysian horror films
LGBT-related horror films
Films directed by Shuhaimi Baba
Pesona Pictures films
Films produced by Shuhaimi Baba
Films with screenplays by Shuhaimi Baba
Pesona Pictures contract players
2007 LGBT-related films